The 1997–98 NBA season was the Kings' 49th season in the National Basketball Association, and 13th season in Sacramento. During the off-season, the Kings signed free agent Terry Dehere. The team decided to add youth to their roster with the addition of rookies Lawrence Funderburke (second round draft pick from the 1994 NBA draft), top draft pick Tariq Abdul-Wahad, second round draft pick Anthony Johnson and undrafted rookie center Michael Stewart. The Kings got off to a slow start losing their first four games on their way to a 5–14 start, but later on won 8 of their 14 games in January, and held a 20–28 record at the All-Star break. At midseason, the team traded Michael Smith and Bobby Hurley the Vancouver Grizzlies in exchange for former Kings forward Otis Thorpe. However, with a 26–36 record as of March 6, the Kings struggled losing 19 of their final 20 games, including a 12-game losing streak and seven straight losses to end the season. They finished fifth in the Pacific Division with a 27–55 record, which was fourteen games behind the 8th-seeded Houston Rockets.

Mitch Richmond averaged 23.2 points per game, and was named to the All-NBA Third Team, and selected for the 1998 NBA All-Star Game, which would be his sixth and final All-Star appearance, while Corliss Williamson showed improvement becoming the team's starting power forward, averaging 17.7 points and 5.6 rebounds per game, and also finishing in second place in Most Improved Player voting, and Billy Owens provided the team with 10.5 points and 7.5 rebounds per game. In addition, Funderburke played a sixth man role, averaging 9.5 points and 4.5 rebounds per game off the bench, but only played 52 games due to injury, while Johnson contributed 7.5 points and 4.3 assists per game, Olden Polynice provided with 7.9 points and 6.3 rebounds per game, and Stewart contributed 6.6 rebounds, and led the team with 2.4 blocks per game. Mahmoud Abdul-Rauf only played just 31 games, missing the final three months of the season with the flu and an corneal ulcer, as he contributed 7.3 points per game off the bench.

Following the season, Richmond was traded along with Thorpe to the Washington Wizards after seven seasons in Sacramento, while Owens and Olden Polynice both signed as free agents with the Seattle SuperSonics, whom Polynice used to play for, Johnson signed with the Atlanta Hawks, Stewart signed with the Toronto Raptors, Abdul-Rauf left to play overseas in Turkey, and head coach Eddie Jordan was fired.

Draft picks

Roster

Regular season

Season standings

z - clinched division title
y - clinched division title
x - clinched playoff spot

Record vs. opponents

Game log

Player statistics

NOTE: Please write the players statistics in alphabetical order by last name.

Awards and records
 Mitch Richmond, All-NBA Third Team

Transactions

References

See also
 1997-98 NBA season

Sacramento Kings seasons
Sacramento
Sacramento
Sacramento